Farrukhnagar railway station is a small railway station in Gurugram district, Haryana. Its code is FN. It serves Farrukhnagar city. The station consists of one platform. The platform is not well sheltered. It lacks many facilities including water and sanitation.

Farrukhnagar lies on a branch line which was laid in 1901 to Garhi Harsaru railway station from Farrukhnagar on Rajputana–Malwa Railway, For many years, the metre-gauge railway line was used to transport salt by steam locomotives and was closed in 2004 for gauge conversion. The converted broad-gauge track became operational in 2011. There has been a demand to extend the track to Jhajjar where it will join Rewari–Jhajjar–Rohtak railway line.

Currently six trains originate and terminate from Farrukhnagar which connects cities like Delhi, Saharanpur, Garhi Harsaru which main junction near the city.

Major trains 
Some of the important trains that run from Farrukhnagar are:

 Farrukhnagar–Delhi Passenger (unreserved)
 Farrukhnagar–Delhi Sarai Rohilla Passenger
 Farrukhnagar–Garhi Harsaru Passenger
 Farrukhnagar–Saharanpur Janta Express (unreserved)
 Farrukhnagar–Garhi Harsaru Heritage Express (weekly on Sunday)

References

Railway stations in Gurgaon district
Delhi railway division
Railway stations opened in 1901